Heo Min-ho (born 1 March 1990) is a South Korean triathlete. He competed in the Men's event at the 2012 Summer Olympics.

References

1990 births
Living people
South Korean male triathletes
Olympic triathletes of South Korea
Triathletes at the 2012 Summer Olympics
Sportspeople from Seoul
Asian Games medalists in triathlon
Triathletes at the 2010 Asian Games
Triathletes at the 2014 Asian Games
Triathletes at the 2018 Asian Games
Asian Games silver medalists for South Korea
Medalists at the 2014 Asian Games
Medalists at the 2018 Asian Games
20th-century South Korean people
21st-century South Korean people